Francis Paniu is a Papua New Guinean rugby league footballer who represented Papua New Guinea in the 2013 World Cup.

Playing career
He currently plays for the Rabaul Gurias in PNG.

References

External links
Statistics at rugbyleagueproject.org

1989 births
Papua New Guinean rugby league players
Hull Kingston Rovers players
Rabaul Gurias players
Papua New Guinea national rugby league team players
Rugby league centres
Living people
Place of birth missing (living people)